In mathematics, a Tate group, named for John Tate, may refer to:
 Barsotti–Tate group
 Mumford–Tate group
 Tate cohomology group
 Tate–Shafarevich group